WUGO (99.7 FM) is a radio station licensed to Grayson, Kentucky. WUGO broadcasts an adult contemporary format. The station serves the Northeast Kentucky area and is currently owned by Carter County Broadcasting Co., Inc. WUGO features programming from CBS News Radio, the Kentucky News Network, as well as broadcasts football and basketball games from both East Carter and West Carter High Schools. WUGO also broadcasts University of Kentucky football and men's basketball games as well as MLB's Cincinnati Reds games. The station has won four National Crystal Radio Awards for community service. Staff includes Jeff Roe (Station Manager), Matt Shufflebarger (News Director) & Mike Nelson (Program Director & sales).

References

External links

UGO
Mainstream adult contemporary radio stations in the United States
Carter County, Kentucky
1967 establishments in Kentucky
Radio stations established in 1967